Phanerophlebia may refer to 
 Phanerophlebia (plant) , a genus of ferns sometimes included in Polystichum 
 , a subgenus of Cryptophlebia, which is a genus of moths